Jean-Paul Amoudry (born 30 March 1950 in Serraval) is a former member of the Senate of France, representing the Haute-Savoie department. He is a member of The Centrists.

References
Page on the Senate website 

1950 births
Living people
French Senators of the Fifth Republic
Union of Democrats and Independents politicians
Senators of Haute-Savoie